Konzell is a municipality in the district of Straubing-Bogen in Bavaria, Germany.

Geography

Konzell is situated in the south of the Bavarian Forest. Here is the spring of the Menach, which flows in the valley of Menach direction the Bogen.

Mountains 
The Gallner Berg to the south, the western summit of the Gallner, and the Kramerschopf to the east are the highest points, each reaching 710 metres. To the north is the Himmelberg at 680 metres.

Urban districts

To Konzell belong the  urban districts Auggenbach, Denkzell, Gossersdorf and Kasparzell.

Impressions

References

Straubing-Bogen